Kazuma (written: , , , , , , , ,  or  in katakana) is a masculine Japanese given name. Notable people with the name include:

Kazuma Eekman, Dutch-Japanese artist
, Japanese voice actor
, Japanese chief executive
, Japanese footballer
, Japanese footballer
, Japanese footballer
, pseudonymous Japanese writer
, Japanese video game artist and game designer
, Japanese singer, member of The Rampage from Exile Tribe
, Japanese artistic gymnast
, Japanese footballer
, Japanese manga artist
, Japanese footballer
, Japanese field hockey player
, Japanese sprinter
, Japanese actor
, Japanese science fiction writer
, Japanese actor, film director, fashion designer and model
, Japanese footballer
, Japanese footballer
, Japanese footballer
, Japanese motorcycle racer
, Japanese footballer

Fictional characters
Kazuma Asogi, a character in Dai Gyakuten Saiban (The Great Ace Attorney Chronicles)
Kazuma Azuma, a character in the manga series Yakitate!! Japan
Kazuma Kenzaki, a character in the television series Kamen Rider Blade
Kazuma Bobata, a character in the anime series Haikyuu!
Kazuma Kiryu, a character in the video game series Yakuza
Kazuma Kuvaru, a minor character in the video game series BlazBlue
Kazuma Kuwabara, a character in the manga series YuYu Hakusho
Kazuma Sohma, a character in the manga series Fruits Basket
Kazuma, a character in the manga series s-CRY-ed
Kazuma, a character in the manga series Noragami
Kazuma Kagato, a character in the manga series Tenchi Muyo!
Kazuma Mikura, a character in the manga series Air Gear
Kazuma Sato, a character in the light novel series KonoSuba
Kazuma Yagami, a character in the manga series Kaze no Stigma
Kazuma Shouji, a character in the Cardfight!! Vanguard
Kazuma Hikari, a planned character in the cancelled video game Mega Man Star Force 4
Kazuma Mamizuka (狸塚 数馬) a character in the manga and anime School Babysitters, the twin brother of Takuma Mamizuka

Japanese masculine given names